What if the Moon Didn't Exist is a collection of speculative articles about different versions of Earth, published in book form in 1993.  They were originally published in Astronomy magazine.

Contents 
The individual scenarios are:

 Solon – Earth without a Moon
 Lunholm – Moon closer to Earth
 Petiel – Earth with less mass
 Urania – Earth's axis tilted like that of Uranus
 Granstar – More massive Sun
 Antar – Effects if a supernova exploded near Earth
 Cerberon – Star passing through the Solar System
 Diablo – Black hole passing through the Earth
 Seeing the world via infrared
 Effects of ozone layer depletion

Reception
Reviews in Publishers Weekly and Kirkus said that the first several stories were interesting, but noted that the conceit grew repetitive.

References

External links
What If the Moon Didn't Exist? Neil F. Comins, published by the Astronomical Society of the Pacific
Reviews

1993 non-fiction books
Astronomy books